Tova Ben-Dov (Hebrew: טובה בן-דב) Honorary Life President of the Women's International Zionist Organization (WIZO), the largest women's Zionist organization in the world.  Elected as President of World WIZO Executive from 2012-2016. In her Capacity as President of World WIZO, she was also Vice President of the World Jewish Congress, a board member of the Jewish Agency for Israel and a board member of the International Alliance of Women. Elected to the WJC Executive Committee, as Vice-President of the WJC Executive and Honorary Board member of the Zionist General Council. She was formerly Chair of Public Relations; Chair of the Properties, Buildings, and Development; Vice-Chair of Fund Raising and Treasurer of World WIZO, Vice Chair of the Executive and Chair of the Executive of World WIZO.

Her lifelong volunteering commitment to WIZO began as a young mother when she joined the WIZO branch in Herzliya Pituach. Tova served in key roles in WIZO Israel including Chair of Women’s Training Department, where she developed Programs that where implemented nationwide and within minority communities; opened consultation stations and WIZO Centers for the empowerment of women. In 1983 Tova accompanied her husband on a 3 year IUA (Israel United Appeal) mission to Durban where she took an active role in WIZO South Africa. On her return to Israel Tova continued in World WIZO as, Chairperson World WIZO Department for Property, Building and Development; Treasurer of World WIZO; Chair of World WIZO Executive and President of World WIZO. In 2011 she was awarded "Honoree of Tel Aviv" for her concern, loyalty and devotion to the welfare and honor of the City of Tel Aviv. In 2016 Tova was conferred the title of Honorary Fellow of the World Zionist Congress.

References

Zionist activists
Living people
Year of birth missing (living people)
Women's International Zionist Organization politicians
People of the Jewish Agency for Israel